Murata is a village (curazia) in the middle of San Marino. It belongs to the municipality of San Marino and is its most populated curazia.

Geography
The village is situated on the hills between the City of San Marino and Fiorentino. It has a quarter named Fonte dell'Ovo, seat of the sport plants of Murata.

Sport
The local football team is the Murata.

See also
San Marino (city)
Cà Berlone
Canepa
Casole
Castellaro
Montalbo
Santa Mustiola

Curazie in San Marino
Geography of the City of San Marino